Ram Bahadur Bohara is a Nepalese politician, belonging to the Communist Party of Nepal (Maoist). In the 2008 Constituent Assembly election he was elected from the Dolpa-1 constituency, winning 9723 votes.

References

Year of birth missing (living people)
Living people
Communist Party of Nepal (Maoist Centre) politicians
Nepalese atheists

Members of the 1st Nepalese Constituent Assembly